The 1962 San Francisco Giants season was the Giants' 80th year in Major League Baseball, their fifth year in San Francisco since their move from New York following the 1957 season, and their third at Candlestick Park. The team finished in first place in the National League with a record of 103 wins and 62 losses. They finished the season tied with their arch-rivals, the Los Angeles Dodgers, for first place in the league, necessitating a three-game tiebreaker playoff to determine the pennant winner. The Giants won two of the three games to take their first National League title since moving to San Francisco, making the Giants the first NL Champions of the 162-game schedule era. They went on to the 1962 World Series, where they lost in seven games to the New York Yankees. The Giants had 1,552 hits in the regular season, the most in the club's San Francisco era.

Offseason
 October 10, 1961: 1961 Major League Baseball expansion draft
Joey Amalfitano was drafted from the Giants by the Houston Colt .45s.
Hobie Landrith was drafted from the Giants by the New York Mets.
 October 16, 1961: Billy Loes was purchased from the Giants by the New York Mets.
 November 27, 1961: Georges Maranda was drafted from the Giants by the Minnesota Twins in the 1961 rule 5 draft.
 November 30, 1961: Eddie Fisher, Dom Zanni, Bob Farley and a player to be named later were traded by the Giants to the Chicago White Sox for Don Larsen and Billy Pierce. The Giants completed the deal by sending Verle Tiefenthaler to the White Sox on August 17, 1962.
 March 2, 1962: Billy Loes was returned to the Giants by the New York Mets.
 March 2, 1962: Billy Loes was released by the Giants.

Regular season

Season standings

Record vs. opponents

Opening Day starters
 Felipe Alou
 Ed Bailey
 Orlando Cepeda
 Jim Davenport
 Chuck Hiller
 Harvey Kuenn
 Juan Marichal
 Willie Mays
 José Pagán

Notable transactions 
 April 29, 1962: Bob Nieman was purchased by the Giants from the Cleveland Indians.

Game log and schedule

|-  style="text-align:center; background:#bfb;"
| 1 || April 10 || Braves || 6–0 || Marichal (1–0) || || || Candlestick Park || 39,177 || 1–0 || W1
|-  style="text-align:center; background:#bfb;"
| 2 || April 11 || Braves || 3–1 || O'Dell (1–0) || || || Candlestick Park || 16,721 || 2–0 || W2
|-  style="text-align:center; background:#bfb;"
| 3 || April 12 || Braves || 8–4 || Sanford (1–0) || || Miller (1) || Candlestick Park || 9,177 || 3–0 || W3
|-  style="text-align:center; background:#bfb;"
| 4 || April 13 || Reds || 7–2 || Pierce (1–0) || || Miller (2) || Candlestick Park || 23,775 || 4–0 || W4
|-  style="text-align:center; background:#bfb;"
| 5 || April 14 || Reds || 13–6 || Larsen (1–0) || || || Candlestick Park || 18,086 || 5–0 || W5
|-  style="text-align:center; background:#fbb;"
| 6 || April 15 || Reds || 3–4 || Marichal (1–1) || || || Candlestick Park || 28,697 || 5–1 || L1
|-  style="text-align:center; background:#bfb;"
| 7 || April 16 || Dodgers || 19–8 || O'Dell (2–0) || || || Candlestick Park || 32,819 || 6–1 || W1
|-  style="text-align:center; background:#fbb;"
| 8 || April 17 || Dodgers || 7–8 || || McCormick (0–1) || || Candlestick Park || 25,841 || 6–2 || L1
|-  style="text-align:center; background:#fbb;"
| 9 || April 18 || @ Braves || 4–6 || || Miller (0–1) || || County Stadium || 30,001 || 6–3 || L2
|-  style="text-align:center; background:#bfb;"
| 10 || April 19 || @ Braves || 7–6 || Marichal (2–1) || || || County Stadium || 4,570 || 7–3 || W1
|-  style="text-align:center; background:#bfb;"
| 11 || April 21 || @ Reds || 8–6 || Larsen (2–0) || || LeMay (1) || Crosley Field || 6,006 || 8–3 || W2
|-  style="text-align:center; background:#fbb;"
| 12 || April 22 || @ Reds || 4–6 || || Sanford (1–1) || || Crosley Field || 6,583 || 8–4 || L1
|-  style="text-align:center; background:#bfb;"
| 13 || April 23 || @ Reds || 4–1 || Pierce (2–0) || || || Crosley Field || 6,483 || 9–4 || W1
|-  style="text-align:center; background:#fbb;"
| 14 || April 24 || @ Pirates || 3–7 || || Marichal (2–2) || || Forbes Field || 18,620 || 9–5 || L1
|-  style="text-align:center; background:#bfb;"
| 15 || April 25 || @ Pirates || 8–3 || Perry (1–0) || || Larsen (1) || Forbes Field || 21,652 || 10–5 || W1
|-  style="text-align:center; background:#bfb;"
| 16 || April 27 || Cubs || 5–4 || Miller (1–1) || || || Candlestick Park || 8,710 || 11–5 || W2
|-  style="text-align:center; background:#bfb;"
| 17 || April 28 || Cubs || 11–2 || Marichal (3–2) || || || Candlestick Park || 14,427 || 12–5 || W3
|-  style="text-align:center; background:#bfb;"
| 18 || April 29 || Cubs || 7–0 || Sanford (2–1) || || || Candlestick Park || n/a || 13–5 || W4
|-  style="text-align:center; background:#bfb;"
| 19 || April 29 || Cubs || 6–0 || Pierce (3–0) || || || Candlestick Park || 40,973 || 14–5 || W5
|-  style="text-align:center; background:#bfb;"
| 20 || April 30 || Pirates || 4–1 || Perry (2–0) || || || Candlestick Park || 9,543 || 15–5 || W6
|-

|-  style="text-align:center; background:#bfb;"
| 21 || May 1 || Pirates || 4–2 || O'Dell (3–0) || || || Candlestick Park || 23,657 || 16–5 || W7
|-  style="text-align:center; background:#bfb;"
| 22 || May 2 || Pirates || 3–2 || Marichal (4–2) || || || Candlestick Park || 9,926 || 17–5 || W8
|-  style="text-align:center; background:#bfb;"
| 23 || May 3 || Pirates || 8–4 || Sanford (3–1) || || || Candlestick Park || 10,723 || 18–5 || W9
|-  style="text-align:center; background:#bfb;"
| 24 || May 4 || @ Cubs || 11–6 || Pierce (4–0) || || Larsen (2) || Wrigley Field || 5,011 || 19–5 || W10
|-  style="text-align:center; background:#fbb;"
| 25 || May 5 || @ Cubs || 8–12 || || Duffalo (0–1) || || Wrigley Field || 11,362 || 19–6 || L1
|-  style="text-align:center; background:#bfb;"
| 26 || May 6 || @ Cubs || 7–3 || O'Dell (4–0) || || || Wrigley Field || 14,090 || 20–6 || W1
|-  style="text-align:center; background:#bfb;"
| 27 || May 8 || @ Cardinals || 4–3 || Marichal (5–2) || || || Busch Stadium || 14,618 || 21–6 || W2
|-  style="text-align:center; background:#fbb;"
| 28 || May 9 || @ Cardinals || 3–7 || || Sanford (3–2) || || Busch Stadium || 12,421 || 21–7 || L1
|-  style="text-align:center; background:#bfb;"
| 29 || May 10 || @ Cardinals || 6–0 || O'Dell (5–0) || || || Busch Stadium || 15,567 || 22–7 || W1
|-  style="text-align:center; background:#fbb;"
| 30 || May 11 || @ Colt .45s || 0–7 || || Perry (2–1) || || Colt Stadium || 19,003 || 22–8 || L1
|-  style="text-align:center; background:#bfb;"
| 31 || May 12 || @ Colt .45s || 11–0 || Marichal (6–2) || || || Colt Stadium || 26,311 || 23–8 || W1
|-  style="text-align:center; background:#bfb;"
| 32 || May 13 || @ Colt .45s || 7–2 || Sanford (4–2) || || || Colt Stadium || 19,879 || 24–8 || W2
|-  style="text-align:center; background:#bfb;"
| 33 || May 15 || Cardinals || 6–3 || Pierce (5–0) || || Miller (3) || Candlestick Park || 30,484 || 25–8 || W3
|-  style="text-align:center; background:#bfb;"
| 34 || May 16 || Cardinals || 7–2 || Marichal (7–2) || || || Candlestick Park || 12,925 || 26–8 || W4
|-  style="text-align:center; background:#fbb;"
| 35 || May 17 || Cardinals || 0–1 || || O'Dell (5–1) || || Candlestick Park || 10,976 || 26–9 || L1
|-  style="text-align:center; background:#fbb;"
| 36 || May 18 || Colt .45s || 2–3 (10) || || Sanford (4–3) || || Candlestick Park || 18,544 || 26–10 || L2
|-  style="text-align:center; background:#bfb;"
| 37 || May 19 || Colt .45s || 10–2 || McCormick (1–1) || || Larsen (3) || Candlestick Park || 16,701 || 27–10 || W1
|-  style="text-align:center; background:#fbb;"
| 38 || May 20 || Colt .45s || 5–6 || || Marichal (7–3) || || Candlestick Park || n/a || 27–11 || L1
|-  style="text-align:center; background:#bfb;"
| 39 || May 20 || Colt .45s || 7–4 || Pierce (6–0) || || || Candlestick Park || 40,932 || 28–11 || W1
|-  style="text-align:center; background:#fbb;"
| 40 || May 21 || @ Dodgers || 1–8 || || O'Dell (5–2) || || Dodger Stadium || 45,192 || 28–12 || L1
|-  style="text-align:center; background:#fbb;"
| 41 || May 22 || @ Dodgers || 1–5 || || Sanford (4–4) || || Dodger Stadium || 46,636 || 28–13 || L2
|-  style="text-align:center; background:#fbb;"
| 42 || May 23 || Phillies || 7–10 || || McCormick (1–2) || || Candlestick Park || 7,314 || 28–14 || L3
|-  style="text-align:center; background:#bfb;"
| 43 || May 24 || Phillies || 7–4 || Miller (2–1) || || || Candlestick Park || 5,680 || 29–14 || W1
|-  style="text-align:center; background:#bfb;"
| 44 || May 25 || Phillies || 10–7 || Pierce (7–0) || || Miller (4) || Candlestick Park || 11,538 || 30–14 || W2
|-  style="text-align:center; background:#bfb;"
| 45 || May 26 || Mets || 7–6 (10) || Larsen (3–0) || || || Candlestick Park || 18,791 || 31–14 || W3
|-  style="text-align:center; background:#bfb;"
| 46 || May 27 || Mets || 7–1 || Sanford (5–4) || || Miller (5) || Candlestick Park || n/a || 32–14 || W4
|-  style="text-align:center; background:#bfb;"
| 47 || May 27 || Mets || 6–5 || Duffalo (1–1) || || Miller (6) || Candlestick Park || 39,551 || 33–14 || W5
|-  style="text-align:center; background:#bfb;"
| 48 || May 30 || @ Phillies || 4–3 (12) || Miller (3–1) || || || Connie Mack Stadium || n/a || 34–14 || W6
|-  style="text-align:center; background:#bfb;"
| 49 || May 30 || @ Phillies || 5–2 || McCormick (2–2) || || Miller (7) || Connie Mack Stadium || 29,739 || 35–14 || W7
|-  style="text-align:center; background:#fbb;"
| 50 || May 31 || @ Phillies || 1–2 || || O'Dell (5–3) || || Connie Mack Stadium || 9,393 || 35–15 || L1
|-

|-  style="text-align:center; background:#bfb;"
| 51 || June 1 || @ Mets || 9–6 || Pierce (8–0) || || Miller (8) || Polo Grounds || 43,742 || 36–15 || W1
|-  style="text-align:center; background:#bfb;"
| 52 || June 2 || @ Mets || 10–1 || Sanford (6–4) || || || Polo Grounds || n/a || 37–15 || W2
|-  style="text-align:center; background:#bfb;"
| 53 || June 2 || @ Mets || 6–4 || O'Dell (6–3) || || Miller (9) || Polo Grounds || 41,001 || 38–15 || W3
|-  style="text-align:center; background:#bfb;"
| 54 || June 3 || @ Mets || 6–1 || Marichal (8–3) || || || Polo Grounds || 34,102 || 39–15 || W4
|-  style="text-align:center; background:#bfb;"
| 55 || June 5 || @ Cubs || 11–6 || O'Dell (7–3) || || || Wrigley Field || 6,087 || 40–15 || W5
|-  style="text-align:center; background:#fbb;"
| 56 || June 6 || @ Cubs || 3–4 || || Larsen (3–1) || || Wrigley Field || 3,783 || 40–16 || L1
|-  style="text-align:center; background:#fbb;"
| 57 || June 7 || @ Cubs || 3–4 || || Pierce (8–1) || || Wrigley Field || 6,656 || 40–17 || L2
|-  style="text-align:center; background:#fbb;"
| 58 || June 8 || @ Cardinals || 4–8 || || Marichal (8–4) || || Busch Stadium || 16,209 || 40–18 || L3
|-  style="text-align:center; background:#fbb;"
| 59 || June 9 || @ Cardinals || 4–8 || || Sanford (6–5) || || Busch Stadium || 17,368 || 40–19 || L4
|-  style="text-align:center; background:#fbb;"
| 60 || June 10 || @ Cardinals || 5–6 || || O'Dell (7–4) || || Busch Stadium || n/a || 40–20 || L5
|-  style="text-align:center; background:#fbb;"
| 61 || June 10 || @ Cardinals || 3–13 || || Duffalo (1–2) || || Busch Stadium || 33,679 || 40–21 || L6
|-  style="text-align:center; background:#bfb;"
| 62 || June 12 || @ Reds || 2–1 || Marichal (9–4) || || || Crosley Field || n/a || 41–21 || W1
|-  style="text-align:center; background:#bfb;"
| 63 || June 12 || @ Reds || 7–5 || McCormick (3–2) || || Larsen (4) || Crosley Field || 18,215 || 42–21 || W2
|-  style="text-align:center; background:#fbb;"
| 64 || June 13 || @ Reds || 0–5 || || Sanford (6–6) || || Crosley Field || 15,837 || 42–22 || L1
|-  style="text-align:center; background:#fbb;"
| 65 || June 14 || @ Reds || 0–8 || || Pierce (8–2) || || Crosley Field || 16,756 || 42–23 || L2
|-  style="text-align:center; background:#fbb;"
| 66 || June 15 || Cardinals || 2–5 || || O'Dell (7–5) || || Candlestick Park || 23,427 || 42–24 || L3
|-  style="text-align:center; background:#bfb;"
| 67 || June 16 || Cardinals || 5–0 || Marichal (10–4) || || || Candlestick Park || 24,844 || 43–24 || W1
|-  style="text-align:center; background:#bfb;"
| 68 || June 17 || Cardinals || 6–3 || Sanford (7–6) || || || Candlestick Park || 40,533 || 44–24 || W2
|-  style="text-align:center; background:#fbb;"
| 69 || June 19 || Colt .45s || 4–6 || || O'Dell (7–6) || || Candlestick Park || 18,749 || 44–25 || L1
|-  style="text-align:center; background:#fbb;"
| 70 || June 20 || Colt .45s || 5–9 || || Miller (3–2) || || Candlestick Park || 10,430 || 44–26 || L2
|-  style="text-align:center; background:#fbb;"
| 71 || June 22 || Braves || 9–11 || || Miller (3–3) || || Candlestick Park || 20,513 || 44–27 || L3
|-  style="text-align:center; background:#bfb;"
| 72 || June 23 || Braves || 4–2 || McCormick (4–2) || || || Candlestick Park || 17,345 || 45–27 || W1
|-  style="text-align:center; background:#bfb;"
| 73 || June 24 || Braves || 3–1 || Marichal (11–4) || || || Candlestick Park || 26,130 || 46–27 || W2
|-  style="text-align:center; background:#bfb;"
| 74 || June 25 || Reds || 3–1 || O'Dell (8–6) || || || Candlestick Park || 9,195 || 47–27 || W3
|-  style="text-align:center; background:#bfb;"
| 75 || June 26 || Reds || 6–5 (10) || Miller (4–3) || || || Candlestick Park || 15,967 || 48–27 || W4
|-  style="text-align:center; background:#bfb;"
| 76 || June 27 || Reds || 6–3 || Bolin (1–0) || || || Candlestick Park || 12,537 || 49–27 || W5
|-  style="text-align:center; background:#fbb;"
| 77 || June 28 || Phillies || 2–7 || || Marichal (11–5) || || Candlestick Park || 7,174 || 49–28 || L1
|-  style="text-align:center; background:#bfb;"
| 78 || June 29 || Phillies || 4–3 (12) || O'Dell (9–6) || || || Candlestick Park || 11,088 || 50–28 || W1
|-  style="text-align:center; background:#bfb;"
| 79 || June 30 || Phillies || 8–3 || Bolin (2–0) || || Miller (10) || Candlestick Park || 11,716 || 51–28 || W2
|-

|-  style="text-align:center; background:#bfb;"
| 80 || July 1 || Phillies || 5–4 || Larsen (4–1) || || Miller (11) || Candlestick Park || 17,612 || 52–28 || W3
|-  style="text-align:center; background:#fbb;"
| 81 || July 2 || Mets || 5–8 || || Miller (4–4) || || Candlestick Park || 11,058 || 52–29 || L1
|-  style="text-align:center; background:#bfb;"
| 82 || July 3 || Mets || 10–1 || Sanford (8–6) || || || Candlestick Park || 7,083 || 53–29 || W1
|-  style="text-align:center; background:#bfb;"
| 83 || July 4 || Mets || 11–4 || Bolin (3–0) || || || Candlestick Park || n/a || 54–29 || W2
|-  style="text-align:center; background:#bfb;"
| 84 || July 4 || Mets || 10–3 || O'Dell (10–6) || || || Candlestick Park || 33,253 || 55–29 || W3
|-  style="text-align:center; background:#fbb;"
| 85 || July 5 || Dodgers || 3–11 || || McCormick (4–3) || || Candlestick Park || 24,915 || 55–30 || L1
|-  style="text-align:center; background:#bfb;"
| 86 || July 6 || Dodgers || 12–3 || Marichal (12–5) || || || Candlestick Park || 41,569 || 56–30 || W1
|-  style="text-align:center; background:#bfb;"
| 87 || July 7 || Dodgers || 10–3 || Sanford (9–6) || || Miller (12) || Candlestick Park || 40,186 || 57–30 || W2
|-  style="text-align:center; background:#fbb;"
| 88 || July 8 || Dodgers || 0–2 || || O'Dell (10–7) || || Candlestick Park || 41,717 || 57–31 || L1
|-  style="text-align:center; background:#bfb;"
| 89 || July 12 || @ Phillies || 5–3 || Sanford (10–6) || || Miller (13) || Connie Mack Stadium || 17,151 || 58–31 || W1
|-  style="text-align:center; background:#fbb;"
| 90 || July 13 || @ Phillies || 2–3 || || O'Dell (10–8) || || Connie Mack Stadium || 18,693 || 58–32 || L1
|-  style="text-align:center; background:#fbb;"
| 91 || July 14 || @ Phillies || 5–6 (10) || || Miller (4–5) || || Connie Mack Stadium || 7,716 || 58–33 || L2
|-  style="text-align:center; background:#fbb;"
| 92 || July 15 || @ Mets || 3–5 || || Pierce (8–3) || || Polo Grounds || n/a || 58–34 || L3
|-  style="text-align:center; background:#bfb;"
| 93 || July 15 || @ Mets || 9–8 || Bolin (4–0) || || Marichal (1) || Polo Grounds || 35,463 || 59–34 || W1
|-  style="text-align:center; background:#bfb;"
| 94 || July 16 || @ Mets || 3–2 || Sanford (11–6) || || || Polo Grounds || 23,280 || 60–34 || W2
|-  style="text-align:center; background:#bfb;"
| 95 || July 17 || @ Braves || 4–3 ||O'Dell (11–8) || || Bolin (1) || County Stadium || 14,584 || 61–34 || W3
|-  style="text-align:center; background:#fbb;"
| 96 || July 18 || @ Braves || 0–6 || || Marichal (12–6) || || County Stadium || 15,324 || 61–35 || L1
|-  style="text-align:center; background:#bfb;"
| 97 || July 19 || @ Braves || 7–3 || Bolin (5–0) || || || County Stadium || 14,158 || 62–35 || W1
|-  style="text-align:center; background:#bfb;"
| 98 || July 20 || @ Pirates || 6–3 || Sanford (12–6) || || Larsen (5) || Forbes Field || 37,705 || 63–35 || W2
|-  style="text-align:center; background:#fbb;"
| 99 || July 21 || @ Pirates || 6–7 (11) || || Larsen (4–2) || || Forbes Field || 23,917 || 63–36 || L1
|-  style="text-align:center; background:#bfb;"
| 100 || July 22 || @ Pirates || 5–4 || Marichal (13–6) || || || Forbes Field || 27,973 || 64–36 || W1
|-  style="text-align:center; background:#bfb;"
| 101 || July 23 || @ Colt .45s || 5–1 || Bolin (6–0) || || || Colt Stadium || 12,096 || 65–36 || W2
|-  style="text-align:center; background:#bfb;"
| 102 || July 24 || @ Colt .45s || 3–1 || Sanford (13–6) || || Larsen (6) || Colt Stadium || 11,289 || 66–36 || W3
|-  style="text-align:center; background:#bfb;"
| 103 || July 25 || @ Colt .45s || 3–2 || O'Dell (12–8) || || Miller (14) || Colt Stadium || 12,344 || 67–36 || W4
|-  style="text-align:center; background:#fbb;"
| 104 || July 27 || @ Dodgers || 1–3 || || Marichal (13–7) || || Dodger Stadium || 54,095 || 67–37 || L1
|-  style="text-align:center; background:#fbb;"
| 105 || July 28 || @ Dodgers || 6–8 || || Bolin (6–1) || || Dodger Stadium || 49,228 || 67–38 || L2
|-  style="text-align:center; background:#fbb;"
| 106 || July 29 || @ Dodgers || 1–11 || || O'Dell (12–9) || || Dodger Stadium || 53,792 || 67–39 || L3
|-

|-  style="text-align:center; background:#fbb;"
| 107 || August 1 || Cubs || 2–3 (10) || || O'Dell (12–10) || || Candlestick Park || 8,930 || 67–40 || L4
|-  style="text-align:center; background:#bfb;"
| 108 || August 2 || Cubs || 4–3 || Pierce (9–3) || || Larsen (7) || Candlestick Park || 7,454 || 68–40 || W1
|-  style="text-align:center; background:#fbb;"
| 109 || August 3 || Pirates || 2–5 || || Marichal (13–8) || || Candlestick Park || 15,910 || 68–41 || L1
|-  style="text-align:center; background:#bfb;"
| 110 || August 4 || Pirates || 6–5 || Sanford (14–6) || || Bolin (2) || Candlestick Park || 29,370 || 69–41 || W1
|-  style="text-align:center; background:#bfb;"
| 111 || August 5 || Pirates || 2–1 || O'Dell (13–10) || || || Candlestick Park || 25,532 || 70–41 || W2
|-  style="text-align:center; background:#bfb;"
| 112 || August 6 || Phillies || 9–2 || Pierce (10–3) || || || Candlestick Park || 6,222 || 71–41 || W3
|-  style="text-align:center; background:#bfb;"
| 113 || August 7 || Phillies || 4–2 || Marichal (14–8) || || || Candlestick Park || 8,531 || 72–41 || W4
|-  style="text-align:center; background:#fbb;"
| 114 || August 8 || Mets || 2–5 || || Bolin (6–2) || || Candlestick Park || 11,411 || 72–42 || L1
|-  style="text-align:center; background:#bfb;"
| 115 || August 9 || Mets || 7–1 || Sanford (15–6) || || || Candlestick Park || 9,988 || 73–42 || W1
|-  style="text-align:center; background:#bfb;"
| 116 || August 10 || Dodgers || 11–2 || O'Dell (14–10) || || || Candlestick Park || 40,304 || 74–42 || W2
|-  style="text-align:center; background:#bfb;"
| 117 || August 11 || Dodgers || 5–4 || Pierce (11–3) || || Miller (15) || Candlestick Park || 41,268 || 75–42 || W3
|-  style="text-align:center; background:#bfb;"
| 118 || August 12 || Dodgers || 5–1 || Marichal (15–8) || || || Candlestick Park || 41,812 || 76–42 || W4
|-  style="text-align:center; background:#bfb;"
| 119 || August 14 || @ Cubs || 9–2 || Sanford (16–6) || || || Wrigley Field || 13,609 || 77–42 || W5
|-  style="text-align:center; background:#fbb;"
| 120 || August 15 || @ Cubs || 5–7 || || Miller (4–5) || || Wrigley Field || 13,131 || 77–43 || L1
|-  style="text-align:center; background:#fbb;"
| 121 || August 16 || @ Cubs || 0–6 || || Pierce (11–4) || || Wrigley Field || 11,870 || 77–44 || L2
|-  style="text-align:center; background:#fbb;"
| 122 || August 17 || @ Braves || 4–6 || || Marichal (15–9) || || County Stadium || 20,781 || 77–45 || L3
|-  style="text-align:center; background:#bfb;"
| 123 || August 18 || @ Braves || 6–4 || Sanford (17–6) || || Bolin (3) || County Stadium || 20,162 || 78–45 || W1
|-  style="text-align:center; background:#fbb;"
| 124 || August 19 || @ Braves || 8–13 || || O'Dell (14–11) || || County Stadium || 20,005 || 78–46 || L1
|-  style="text-align:center; background:#fbb;"
| 125 || August 20 || @ Braves || 4–9 || || Larsen (4–3) || || County Stadium || 15,906 || 78–47 || L2
|-  style="text-align:center; background:#fbb;"
| 126 || August 22 || @ Mets || 4–5 || || Larsen (4–4) || || Polo Grounds || 33,569 || 78–48 || L3
|-  style="text-align:center; background:#bfb;"
| 127 || August 23 || @ Mets || 2–1 (10) || Marichal (16–9) || || || Polo Grounds || 18,815 || 79–48 || W1
|-  style="text-align:center; background:#bfb;"
| 128 || August 24 || @ Phillies || 6–0 || O'Dell (15–11) || || || Connie Mack Stadium || 19,454 || 80–48 || W2
|-  style="text-align:center; background:#bfb;"
| 129 || August 25 || @ Phillies || 6–1 || Pierce (12–4) || || || Connie Mack Stadium || 16,738 || 81–48 || W3
|-  style="text-align:center; background:#bfb;"
| 130 || August 26 || @ Phillies || 7–4 || Sanford (18–6) || || Bolin (4) || Connie Mack Stadium || 14,855 || 82–48 || W4
|-  style="text-align:center; background:#bfb;"
| 131 || August 28 || Braves || 4–3 || Marichal (17–9) || || || Candlestick Park || 24,027 || 83–48 || W5
|-  style="text-align:center; background:#fbb;"
| 132 || August 29 || Braves || 3–10 || || O'Dell (15–12) || || Candlestick Park || 14,399 || 83–49 || L1
|-  style="text-align:center; background:#bfb;"
| 133 || August 30 || Braves || 3–2 || Sanford (19–6) || || Larsen (8) || Candlestick Park || 12,496 || 84–49 || W1
|-  style="text-align:center; background:#bfb;"
| 134 || August 31 || Reds || 10–2 || Pierce (13–4) || || || Candlestick Park || 26,547 || 85–49 || W2
|-

|-  style="text-align:center; background:#fbb;"
| 135 || September 1 || Reds || 5–10 || || Marichal (17–10) || || Candlestick Park || 26,498 || 85–50 || L1
|-  style="text-align:center; background:#bfb;"
| 136 || September 2 || Reds || 6–4 || O'Dell (16–12) || || || Candlestick Park || 34,312 || 86–50 || W1
|-  style="text-align:center; background:#bfb;"
| 137 || September 3 || @ Dodgers || 7–3 || Sanford (20–6) || || || Dodger Stadium || 54,418 || 87–50 || W2
|-  style="text-align:center; background:#fbb;"
| 138 || September 4 || @ Dodgers || 4–5 || || Pierce (13–5) || || Dodger Stadium || 51,567 || 87-51 || L1
|-  style="text-align:center; background:#bfb;"
| 139 || September 5 || @ Dodgers || 3–0 || Marichal (18–10) || || Bolin (5) || Dodger Stadium || 54,395 || 88-51 || W1
|-  style="text-align:center; background:#bfb;"
| 140 || September 6 || @ Dodgers || 9–6 || Bolin (7–2) || || Miller (16) || Dodger Stadium || 54,263 || 89–51 || W2
|-  style="text-align:center; background:#bfb;"
| 141 || September 7 || Cubs || 6–5 || Sanford (21–6) || || Miller (17) || Candlestick Park || 14,652 || 90–51 || W3
|-  style="text-align:center; background:#bfb;"
| 142 || September 8 || Cubs || 7–2 || Pierce (14–5) || || Bolin (6) || Candlestick Park || 17,643 || 91–51 || W4
|-  style="text-align:center; background:#bfb;"
| 143 || September 9 || Cubs || 5–4 || McCormick (5–3) || || Larsen (9) || Candlestick Park || 26,049 || 92–51 || W5
|-  style="text-align:center; background:#bfb;"
| 144 || September 10 || Pirates || 4–1 || O'Dell (17–12) || || || Candlestick Park || 19,498 || 93–51 || W6
|-  style="text-align:center; background:#bfb;"
| 145 || September 11 || Pirates || 2–0 || Sanford (22–6) || || || Candlestick Park || 10,283 || 94–51 || W7
|-  style="text-align:center; background:#fbb;"
| 146 || September 12 || @ Reds || 1–4 || || Pierce (14–6) || || Crosley Field || 17,564 || 94–52 || L1
|-  style="text-align:center; background:#fbb;"
| 147 || September 13 || @ Reds || 2–7 || || McCormick (5–4) || || Crosley Field || 16,421 || 94–53 || L2
|-  style="text-align:center; background:#fbb;"
| 148 || September 14 || @ Pirates || 1–5 || || O'Dell (17–13) || || Forbes Field || 14,354 || 94–54 || L3
|-  style="text-align:center; background:#fbb;"
| 149 || September 15 || @ Pirates || 1–5 || || Sanford (22–7) || || Forbes Field || 10,340 || 94–55 || L4
|-  style="text-align:center; background:#fbb;"
| 150 || September 16 || @ Pirates || 4–6 (10) || || Miller (4–6) || || Forbes Field || 14,216 || 94–56 || L5
|-  style="text-align:center; background:#fbb;"
| 151 || September 17 || @ Pirates || 2–5 || || McCormick (5–5) || || Forbes Field || 8,364 || 94–57 || L6
|-  style="text-align:center; background:#bfb;"
| 152 || September 19 || @ Cardinals || 7–4 || O'Dell (18–13) || || || Busch Stadium || 8,314 || 95–57 || W1
|-  style="text-align:center; background:#fbb;"
| 153 || September 20 || @ Cardinals || 4–5 || || LeMay (0–1) || || Busch Stadium || 6,497 || 95–58 || L1
|-  style="text-align:center; background:#bfb;"
| 154 || September 21 || @ Colt .45s || 11–5 || Perry (3–1) || || Miller (18) || Colt Stadium || 12,180 || 96–58 || W1
|-  style="text-align:center; background:#fbb;"
| 155 || September 22 || @ Colt .45s || 5–6 || || Miller (4–7) || || Colt Stadium || 17,125 || 96–59 || L1
|-  style="text-align:center; background:#bfb;"
| 156 || September 23 || @ Colt .45s || 10–3 || O'Dell (19–13) || || || Colt Stadium || 9,623 || 97–59 || W1
|-  style="text-align:center; background:#bfb;"
| 157 || September 25 || Cardinals || 4–2 || Sanford (23–7) || || || Candlestick Park || 10,965 || 98–59 || W2
|-  style="text-align:center; background:#bfb;"
| 158 || September 26 || Cardinals || 6–3 || Pierce (15–6) || || Larsen (10) || Candlestick Park || 6,247 || 99–59 || W3
|-  style="text-align:center; background:#fbb;"
| 159 || September 27 || Cardinals || 4–7 || || O'Dell (19–14) || || Candlestick Park || 6,812 || 99–60 || L1
|-  style="text-align:center; background:#bfb;"
| 160 || September 29 || Colt .45s || 11–5 || Sanford (24–7) || || Miller (19) || Candlestick Park || n/a || 100–60 || W1
|-  style="text-align:center; background:#fbb;"
| 161 || September 29 || Colt .45s || 2–4 || || Marichal (18–11) || || Candlestick Park || 26,268 || 101–60 || L1
|-  style="text-align:center; background:#bfb;"
| 162 || September 30 || Colt .45s || 2–1 || Miller (5–7) || || || Candlestick Park || 41,327 || 101–61 || W1
|-

|-  style="text-align:center; background:#bfb;"
| 163 || October 1 || Dodgers || 8–0 || Pierce (16–6) || Koufax (14–7) || || Candlestick Park || 32,652 || 102–61 || W2
|-  style="text-align:center; background:#fbb;"
| 164 || October 2 || @ Dodgers || 7–8 || Williams (14–12) || Bolin (7–3) || || Dodger Stadium || 25,321 || 102–62 || L1
|-  style="text-align:center; background:#bfb;"
| 165 || October 3 || @ Dodgers || 6–4 || Larsen (5–4) || Roebuck (10–2) || Pierce (1) || Dodger Stadium || 45,693 || 103–62 || W1
|-

Postseason

|-  style="text-align:center; background:#fbb;"
| 1 WS || October 4 || Yankees || 2–6 || Ford (1–0) || O'Dell (0–1) || || Candlestick Park || 43,852 || 0–1 || L1
|-  style="text-align:center; background:#bfb;"
| 2 WS || October 5 || Yankees || 2–0 || Sanford (1–0) || Terry (0–1) || || Candlestick Park || 43,910 || 1–1 || W1
|-  style="text-align:center; background:#fbb;"
| 3 WS || October 7 || @ Yankees || 2–3 || Stafford (1–0) || Pierce (0–1) || || Yankee Stadium || 71,434 || 1–2 || L1
|-  style="text-align:center; background:#bfb;"
| 4 WS || October 8 || @ Yankees || 7–3 || Larsen (1–0) || Coates (0–1) || O'Dell (1) || Yankee Stadium || 66,607 || 2–2 || W1
|-  style="text-align:center; background:#fbb;"
| 5 WS || October 10 || @ Yankees || 3–5 || Terry (1–1) || Sanford (1–1) || || Yankee Stadium || 63,165 || 2–3 || L1
|-  style="text-align:center; background:#bfb;"
| 6 WS || October 15 || Yankees || 5–2 || Pierce (1–1) || Ford (1–1) || || Candlestick Park || 43,948 || 3–3 || W1
|-  style="text-align:center; background:#fbb;"
| 7 WS || October 16 || Yankees || 0–1 || Terry (2–1) || Sanford (1–2) || || Candlestick Park || 43,948 || 3–4 || L1
|-

Roster

Player stats

Batting

Starters by position 
Note: Pos = Position; G = Games played; AB = At bats; R = Runs scored; H = Hits; Avg. = Batting average; HR = Home runs; RBI = Runs batted in; SB = Stolen bases

Other batters
Note: G = Games played; AB = At bats; R = Runs scored; H = Hits; Avg. = Batting average; HR = Home runs; RBI = Runs batted in; SB = Stolen bases

Pitching

Starting pitchers
Note: G = Games pitched; IP = Innings pitched; W = Wins; L = Losses; ERA = Earned run average; SO = Strikeouts

Other pitchers
Note: G = Games pitched; IP = Innings pitched; W = Wins; L = Losses; ERA = Earned run average; SO = Strikeouts

Relief pitchers
Note: G = Games pitched; W = Wins; L = Losses; SV = Saves; ERA = Earned run average; SO = Strikeouts

1962 World Series

Game 1
October 4, 1962, at Candlestick Park in San Francisco

Roger Maris' two-run double in the first inning set up Yankee starter Whitey Ford with a lead, but Willie Mays scored for the Giants in the second, ending Ford's record consecutive scoreless inning streak at 33. Chuck Hiller's double and Felipe Alou's hit in the third tied the game, but the Yankees broke the tie in the 7th on Clete Boyer's HR and scored three insurance runs in the final two innings. Ford's complete game victory was the first of six in the series, four for the Yankees and two for the Giants.

Game 2
October 5, 1962, at Candlestick Park in San Francisco

With the Giants protecting a 1–0 lead in the 7th inning, Willie McCovey smashed a tremendous home run over the right field fence to boost 24-game winner Jack Sanford to 2–0 shutout of the Yankees, who managed only 3 hits.

Game 3
October 7, 1962, at Yankee Stadium in New York City

The Yankees ended a scoreless tie in the 7th, scoring three times. Roger Maris drove a base hit off starter Billy Pierce for two runs batted in, and alert base-running allowed him to score the winning run in a 3–2 Yankee victory. Giants catcher Ed Bailey's 2-run homer in the top of the 9th left the Giants a run short.

Game 4
October 8, 1962, at Yankee Stadium in New York City

For the second time in two days, a Giants' catcher stroked a two-run homer when Tom Haller hit his off Whitey Ford in the second inning. After the Yankees tied the score at 2–2, second baseman Chuck Hiller hit the first National League grand slam in World Series history in the 7th, and the Giants went on to win 7–3. The game marked the only appearance in this series of future Hall-of-famer Juan Marichal, who started for the Giants.

Don Larsen was the winning pitcher in relief, six years to the day of his perfect game in the 1956 World Series.

Game 5
October 10, 1962, at Yankee Stadium in New York City

Hot hitting José Pagán drove in two runs with a single in the third and a home run in the 5th, but with the score tied 2–2 in the 8th, Tom Tresh walloped what proved to be the winning homer,  a three-run shot that scored Bobby Richardson and Tony Kubek in front of him. With the series returning to San Francisco the Yankees had the edge, 3 games to 2, only to have the sixth game delayed four days by rain.

Game 6
October 15, 1962, at Candlestick Park in San Francisco

In a battle of left-handed starting pitchers, Pierce out-dueled Ford and tossed a brilliant complete-game 3-hitter as the Giants evened the series at three wins apiece with a 5–2 victory. The Yankees' only runs came on a Maris solo home run in the 5th inning and an RBI single by Tony Kubek in the 8th inning.

Game 7
October 16, 1962, at Candlestick Park in San Francisco

The only run of this classic game occurred in the 5th inning when Tony Kubek grounded into a double play, with Bill Skowron scoring from third. Ralph Terry, pitching the seventh game instead of Jim Bouton because of the rain delays, had given up Bill Mazeroski's Series-winning walk-off home run two years earlier in Pittsburgh but in his third start completely stifled the Giants' power hitters.

In the bottom of the 9th, pinch-hitter Matty Alou, batting for relief pitcher Billy O'Dell, led off the inning with a bunt base hit after first having a foul ball dropped, but Terry struck out the next two batters, Felipe Alou and Hiller. Mays hit a double into the right field corner, but Maris brilliantly played the carom, then hit cut-off man Richardson with a throw that was relayed perfectly to home. Alou, already aware of Maris' great arm, stopped at third. Facing Willie McCovey with two outs, Terry elected to pitch to him rather than walk the bases loaded and bring up Orlando Cepeda. Terry's inside fastball on the second pitch completely handcuffed McCovey, who nonetheless adjusted his bat in mid-swing to extend his arms and hit what he later claimed was the hardest ball he had ever struck. The line drive appeared at first to be going over the head of a perfectly positioned Richardson, but was in fact sinking from topspin, and Richardson made the catch without leaping to end the game. The Yankees won their 20th World Championship; they would not win another World Championship until 1977.

Awards and honors
1962 All-Star Game
 Felipe Alou
 Orlando Cepeda (starting 1B)
 Jim Davenport
 Juan Marichal
 Willie Mays (starting CF)

Farm system

Notes

References
 1962 San Francisco Giants at Baseball Reference
 1962 San Francisco Giants at Baseball Almanac

San Francisco Giants seasons
San Francisco Giants season
National League champion seasons
San Fran